Knee Deep Records (also known as Kneedeep Records) was a Canadian independent record label, specializing in hip hop music.

Based in Toronto, Ontario, Knee Deep was originally a home recording studio. The label was founded in 1995 by record producer Day and rapper Choclair. The label's first 12" single—"Father Time" by Saukrates b/w "Twenty One Years" by Choclair—is considered an underground hip hop classic. In 1996, the label released Kardinal Offishall's first single, "Naughty Dread", which received a Juno Award nomination for Best Rap Recording in 1997; Choclair won the award for his EP, What It Takes. After the label was shut down in the early 2000s, Day and Choclair founded Greenhouse Music in 2003.

See also
List of record labels

References

External links
Knee Deep Records at Discogs

Canadian independent record labels
Defunct record labels of Canada
Canadian hip hop record labels
Record labels established in 1995